Yangchenghu railway station  is a railway station of Shanghai-Nanjing Intercity Railway. It is  located on the west side of Kunshan, Suzhou, Jiangsu Province, China.

The Shanghai–Nanjing intercity railway passes adjacent to the station, but does not stop. The next station to the east, Kunshan South, serves both lines.

References

Railway stations in Suzhou
Stations on the Shanghai–Nanjing Intercity Railway